Sigurlás Þorleifsson  ( – 24 April 2018) was an Icelandic footballer. He was part of the Iceland national football team between 1979 and 1982. He played 10 matches, scoring 2 goals. With Knattspyrnufélagið Víkingur he was topscorer of the 1979 Úrvalsdeild with twelve goals. Later with his club Íþróttabandalag Vestmannaeyja he was again topscorer af the 1981 Úrvalsdeild (12 goals) and 1982 Úrvalsdeild (10 goals). With Íþróttabandalag Vestmannaeyja he also competed in the 1980–81 European Cup, scoring 1 goal against Baník Ostrava.

Death
Sigurlás collapsed while on a hike with friends on Heimaklettur in Heimaey on 24 April 2018. Resuscitations were unsuccessful and he was pronounced dead at Vestmannaeyjar hospital later that day.

See also
 List of Iceland international footballers
 Úrvalsdeild

References

Further reading
 
 
 
 EU-Football.ru 

1957 births
Living people
Sigurlas Thorleifsson
Sigurlas Thorleifsson
Sigurlas Thorleifsson
Place of birth missing (living people)
Sigurlas Thorleifsson
Association football forwards